The Midewin National Tallgrass Prairie (MNTP) is a tallgrass prairie reserve and similarly preserved as United States National Grassland operated by the United States Forest Service. The first national tallgrass prairie ever designated in the U.S. and the largest conservation site in the Chicago Wilderness region, it is located on the site of the former Joliet Army Ammunition Plant between the towns of Elwood, Manhattan and Wilmington in northeastern Illinois. Since 2015, it has hosted a conservation herd of American bison to study their interaction with prairie restoration and conservation.

Ecology
The tallgrass prairie reserve is in the central forest-grasslands transition ecoregion of the temperate grasslands, savannas and shrublands biome.

Midewin remains the only federal tallgrass prairie preserve east of the Mississippi River, where surviving areas of that habitat are extremely rare. With the adjacent Des Plaines Fish and Wildlife Area and a number of other state and county protected areas in the immediate area, Midewin forms the heart of a conservation macrosite totaling more than 40,000 acres of protected land.

The pre-European settlement vegetation map of Midewin shows most of the site was prairie prior to the arrival of European settlers. The northwestern corner of the site along Jackson Creek was forest. Another small, forested area existed in the extreme southwest corner of Midewin along the Kankakee River and Prairie Creek.

Several not-for-profit conservation organizations have played active roles in the restoration of high-quality tallgrass prairie, dolomite prairie,  sedge meadows, swales and related communities at Midewin. These include the Wetlands Initiative, Openlands, and the Illinois chapter of The Nature Conservancy and several other members of the Chicago Wilderness collaborative.

History

The name Midewin is a Potowatomi Native American word referring to the tribe's healers, who it was believed also kept the tribal society in balance. Research since the establishment of the park has found evidence of a pre-European–contact village (c. 1600) from the Oneota culture in a place on the site called Middle Creek.

Establishment
The Midewin National Tallgrass Prairie was established by federal law in 1996. Major proponents of the prairie establishment and restoration included World War II flying ace William J. Cullerton.

The Illinois Land Conservation Act mandates that Midewin be managed to meet four primary objectives:
 To conserve, restore, and enhance the native populations and habitats of fish, wildlife, and plants.
 To provide opportunities for scientific, environmental, and land use education and research.
 To allow the continuation of existing agricultural uses of lands within Midewin National Tallgrass Prairie for the next 20 years, or for compatible resource management uses thereafter.
 To provide recreational opportunities that are compatible with the above purposes.

Land

The first land transfer from the Army to the Forest Service took place on March 10, 1997, and included  of land that was believed to be free from contamination.

Bison

The 20-year plan will study the relationship between the historic large grazing animal, which almost became extinct, and prairie restoration and health. In October, a herd of 27 bison were introduced. Four bulls were transferred from the U.S. Department of Agriculture's Animal and Plant Health Inspection Service, Fort Collins, Colorado, and 23 cows were obtained from a ranch in Gann Valley, in Buffalo County, South Dakota. This was the first U.S. Forest Service project of its kind. By late spring 2017, births had increased the size of the herd to around 50.

Access
After a period of ecological restoration, part of the prairie opened to visitors in 2004.

The MNTP headquarters entrance and visitors center is located on Illinois Route 53, near the center of the preserve.

See also
 Shortgrass prairie
 Tallgrass prairie
 United States National Grassland
 List of protected grasslands of North America

Notes

References
 usda.gov: Text of Illinois Land Conservation Act of 1995 — law establishing Midewin National Tallgrass Prairie.

External links

  Midewin National Tallgrass Prairie, US Forest Service
 "A Midewin Almanac", blog covering the restoration of the site
 The National Forest Foundation: "Restoration and Conservation Plan for Midewin National Tallgrass Prairie" — (2011 plan)

Grasslands of the North American Great Plains
Geography of Will County, Illinois
National Grasslands of the United States
Prairies
Protected areas of Illinois
Protected areas of Will County, Illinois
Protected areas established in 1996
Grasslands of Illinois
1996 establishments in Illinois